There are currently two symbols of Brussels. Both the flag and the emblem of the Brussels-Capital Region depict the Iris pseudacorus (yellow iris), a flower native to the Brussels area. Additionally, every municipality of the region has its own flag and coat of arms.

Flag

The flag of the Brussels-Capital Region depicts the Iris pseudacorus (yellow iris), which is native to the Brussels area, against a blue backdrop.

The valley of the river Senne has housed Brussels for more than 1,000 years. Over time, the lower town progressively spread out across the marshy ground. In the age of the Dukes of Brabant, the marshy plains covered with golden irises encircled the town walls.
As the legend goes, this simple plant led the Duke's soldiers to a great strategic victory. The soldiers knew that the iris only needs to be immersed in a few centimetres of water to grow. So they broke into a gallop across the flooded plains, carefully guiding their horses through the flocks of irises. Their opponents, less knowledgeable in botany and encouraged by the apparently careless gallop of the Duke's soldiers, became definitively mired in the marshes.

Iris pseudacorus is the scientific name of the golden iris, the symbol of the region of Brussels-Capital, which is widely used (tramways, subway, taxis etc...) but little-known.

The marsh iris has long been the symbol of Brussels and was not simply chosen as the symbol of Brussels when the region of Brussels-Capital was created (18 June 1989), as is often believed. In fact, back in 1924, R. Cornette wrote that "this flower was chosen because it grows in the marshes, recalling that the capital was founded on the marshy banks of the Senne river and its tributaries" (Maalbeek, Roodkloosterbeek, Geleytsbeek, Kerkebeek, Leybeek, Woluwe...).
Nowadays, in spite of the ultra-rapid urbanisation, the iris can still be found in its natural habitat in the Vale of Vuylbeek, in the Sonian Forest.

Emblem

On 5 March 1991, the Regional Council of Brussels-Capital chose the iris as emblem for the region. A public contest was organized to define its design. After several adventures, the proposal of Jacques Richez was accepted by the authorities.

The iris is a bulb that blossoms into large, decorative flowers. It grows particularly well in marshes, with which the territory of Brussels was originally covered.

The law describes the different versions of the flag and arms (colour specification according to Pantone system):

It is often said that the iris inspired the French fleur-de-lis, though without any serious evidence. The case of the fleur-de-lis is deeply scrutinized by M. Pastoureau [pst98] in a well-documented 16-page text. Whether the fleur-de-lis was inspired by a real iris, broom, furze or lotus is not known. 

By the Law of 16 May 1991 the iris flower was accepted as the emblem of the region. The flag is blue with a white bordered yellow iris flower, with proportions 2:3.

Municipal symbols

City of Brussels

Coat of arms
The coat of arms of the City of Brussels shows two lions on a grassy mount supporting a red shield. The motif of the escutcheon is a golden Archangel Michael (the patron saint of Brussels) slaying a black Devil by piercing it with a spear shaped like a cross. Other elements include two crossed flags behind the shield; one showing a lion on a black field and the other repeating the motif of the shield on a red field.

A lesser version of the coat of arms which includes the shield only, is also common.

Flag

The municipal flag of Brussels (City of Brussels), as flown from the Town Hall and other buildings is a rectangle, divided horizontally with green over red, with a very large version of the municipal logotype in the centre, and a stylised, disc-shaped silhouette of St. Michael trampling the devil, in dark yellow. It is essentially the same motif as the coat of arms.

Other

See also
 Archangel Michael
 Iris pseudacorus

References

External links
Webside on the Coat of Arms of the City of Brussels

Culture in Brussels
History of Brussels
Brussels
Brussels
Brussels